Bog-trotter may refer to:

 A derogatory term for some types of Irishmen
 Bruce Bogtrotter, a character in the Matilda franchise
 Bogtrotter: An Autobiography with Lyrics, a 1980 book by Dory Previn
 The 1991 winner of the Greenham Stakes
 A folk name for the Eurasian bittern
 In UK Parliamentary slang, a party's parliamentary whip whose job was, at a parliamentary division, to quickly check round the Parliament building's toilets to check if any of his party's members were in there, as a few members missing at a vote may lose the vote, if the vote is close.